The Stencil Subtractor frame was a ciphered text recyphering tool that was invented by British Army Intelligence Officer and cryptographer John Tiltman and was ready for trial by April 1941 but was not adopted officially by the British Forces until March 1942, and not brought into service until June 1943. It was used together with Subtractor tables, placed on top of the table and the numerical values visible in the gaps of the SS Frame were used to encipher the underlying numerical code (such as the War Office Cipher, RAF cipher or Naval cipher etc.).

References

Cryptographic hardware
Encryption devices
World War II military equipment of the United Kingdom